Baseball arbitration can refer to:
 Pendulum arbitration
 Salary arbitration during free agency (Major League Baseball) in the United States